Max Hicks may refer to:
 Max Hicks (American football)
 Max Hicks (rugby union)